Klenn Divoko (born 21 June 1993) is a Congolese handball player for CARA Brazzaville and the Congolese national team.

She participated at the 2021 World Women's Handball Championship in Spain.

References

1993 births
Living people
Congolese female handball players